Youth Theatre is a theatre in Novi Sad, Serbia.

Youth Theatre may also refer to:

Australia
Perth Youth Theatre 
Platform Youth Theatre 
Track Youth Theatre 
Victorian Youth Theatre

Ireland
Youth Theatre Ireland
Independent Youth Theatre

Serbia
Youth Theatre

United Kingdom
Birmingham Youth Theatre 
Burnley Youth Theatre 
Croydon Youth Theatre Organisation 
Everyman and Playhouse Youth Theatre 
Manchester Youth Theatre 
Middlesbrough Youth Theatre 
Musical Youth Theatre Company 
National Youth Music Theatre
National Youth Theatre 
Oxford Youth Theatre 
PACE Youth Theatre 
Scottish Youth Theatre 
Stamford Senior Youth Theatre
Youth Music Theatre UK
Zenith Youth Theatre Company

United States
Mosaic Youth Theatre of Detroit 
New Jersey Youth Theatre 
Milwaukee Youth Theatre
Valley Youth Theatre

Other
Bryantsev Youth Theatre, Russia
Kiev Academic Youth Theatre, Ukraine
Mostar Youth Theatre, Bosnia and Herzegovina
Mostar Youth Theatre 1974, Bosnia and Herzegovina
National Youth Theatre Company, New Zealand
Slovenian Youth Theatre, Slovenia
Workers' Youth Theatre, USSR
Youth Theatre on the Fontanka, Russia
Turkmen National Theatre of Youth

Youth theatre companies